The Safe is a Russian band, active since the late 1980s. Known for their original poetry and music style, they recognizes as one of the most enigmatic bands in Russian underground music, with a sizable stock of more than thirty albums.

History

Formation
The Safe was formed in 1987 in Palekh, a settlement with a long history of Russian lacquer miniature painting. The town's creative atmosphere helped shape band members Nikolay Kovalev, Sergey Karavaev, Ivan Beketov, Sergey Shamin and Yuriy Petrov, three of whom attended Palekh Art School. The members were also inspired by the movies of Russian director Andrei Tarkovsky, who visited the school. Some 20 years later, the Safe played at the closing of the first Zerkalo International Film Festival named after Tarkovsky.

In 1989, the Safe joined the newly established Ivanovo Musicians Association (Rock Club). The Safe participated in its sessions and festivals. Mass media called the Safe the most poetic band of the region, and primary songwriters Nikolay Kovalev and Sergey Karavaev were awarded for best lyrics. The band earned its initial income from concerts in Poland; however in the early '90s, changes occurred in Russia, which led to the disintegration of the Ivanovo Musicians Association.

1990s

Since 1992, the Safe chose another form of existence. Once a year, the musicians would get together to record a new album on their own label Safe Records and play a couple of concerts. The rest of the time they would carry on with their primary occupations (Kovalev, Beketov and Petrov are painters and Karavaev works in medicine). The musicians admit that it was financial independence from music that made it possible for them to preserve the creative independence of their music and lyrics.

'Style, style, style!!!' — proclaimed the young Safers in their earliest days. However, it is very hard to define the Safe's music style, as it changes throughout multiple albums, melding 80's new wave,  jazz rhythms, touches of Latin rhythms, venturing mixing in DJ style, and somewhat cosmopolitan ethnic melodies… It is an original combination of styles.

2000s
Gradually, a creative association established around the team that arranged various cultural and art performances. The Safe helped Palekh music school. They issued LPs of the children's orchestra and choir. They created a unique literary and musical album called 'Music of the Winters in Palekh' (Muzyka Palekhskikh Zim).

They also produce amateur feature films: Upadanie (Falling-Down) 1999 after Starukha (Old Woman) by Daniil Kharms and Tot Bereg (That Shore) 2000 based on the own original script. (Scripted and directed by Nikolay Kovalev and Alexey Zhiryakov).

During the pick-up, Kovalev finds creative touch-points with his old friend, artist and musician,  Mikhail Larionov who brilliantly acted the part of Old Woman in "Falling-Down". At the turn of the century, the Safe's membership is updated and Larionov brings to the band some elements of the eccentric show. This ingenious musician and showman could make sound not only of classical instruments (the wind and the strings) or self-made instruments (postindustrial hurdy-gurdy), but also "non-musical" instruments (jar, water plug, plastic watering pot, etc.). He turned Safe concerts from neoromantic laid-back actions into really effervescent performances with humor and irony.

The updated band also included Mikhail's daughter Maria (percussion, harmonica & trumpet), Tatyana Sviridenko (keyboard & back vocal) and Pavel Bakharev (drums & back vocal). The Safe gave many concerts with this stage crew. "Over one year we delivered more concerts than in all previous time of our band existence" — Nikolay Kovalev says in his interview in the end of 2005.

At that time, the group releases two diverse but very strong LPs: Chas Tainstva (Mystery Hour) in 2004 and Pereferiynoe Zrenie (Peripheral Eyesight) in 2005.

The presentation of the latter is accompanied by a photographic exhibition of the same name and a performance. The songs of Peripheral Eyesight are dedicated to existing people who surround us on the periphery of our day-to-day interests. The sound of the album combines the sounds that surround a person, including working printer and jingle of tableware.

"The First Duty of Police Inspector Klochkov" becomes a mega-hit. It is a real story of the first duty of a police inspector whose name is Klochkov. The song was issued as an independent maxi-single in 2006. Naturally, it is a self-consistent LP of 9 compositions devoted to one character.

In 2007, the Safe released a milestone LP Minory Vesny (Minors of Spring). New versions of 13 songs of various years absolutely do not resemble a compilation, and its long-awaited concert sound gives the album even more integrity.

"…The gorgeous 'Marihuana', three tracks from the very old and the most conceptual album and the following… eight naturally fabulous tracks that one after another, logically and without pauses, set up an internal spring which releases all its bliss-out accurately at "Mastodon" track…"  (Pavlov's quote from Я& newspaper.)

Mikhail Larionov unexpectedly passes away on 5 October 2007, just one month before their jubilee concert commemorating 20 years of the band.
Overcoming the grief of loss, the Safe stages their jubilee concert and invites musicians from other bands and jazz orchestra under the leadership of Yuriy Strepetov. The concert is dedicated to the memory of Mikhail Larionov.

Cooperation with Strepetov's jazz orchestra continued in the form of joint concert program and preparation of stuff for the new album.

2010s
From 2010–2013, the Safe played in a number of local and all-Russian music festivals including the famous Nashestvie.

Members
Nikolay Kovalev — vocal, guitar, bass, keyboard
Sergey Karavaev — bass, back vocal, guitar, keyboard
Tatyana Sviridenko — keyboard, back vocal
Pavel Bakharev — drums
Alexander Leonov — saxophone, flute, bongo
Patrick Sandoe — backup bass

Discography

Albums 
1987 — Vorobyiny Tvist (Sparrow's Twist)
1988 — Opavshiy Den (Shacked Day)
1989 — Vremya Golodnykh Snov (Time of Hungry Dreams)
1989 — Deti Blyuza (Children of the Blues)
1990 — Zhertvoprinoshenie (Immolation)
1991 — Blazhenny Tuman (Blessed Fog)
1991 — Vetkhaya Radost (Shabby Joy)
1992 — Zovuschaya v Dal (Calling Away)
1992 — 12 ½ Mesyatsev (12 ½  Months)
1993 — Khranitel Ognya (Fire Keeper)
1994 — Prosnuvshis sredi Tsvetov (Woken Up Among Flowers, remix)
1994 — Zloy, Plokhoy… (Evil, Bad…)
1995 — Trans (Trance)
1996 — Suitsidalny Terror (Suicide Terror)
1997 — Life-10-live
1997 — Reincarnatsiya Chuvstv (Reincarnation of Feelings)
1998 — Les (Forest)
1999 — Trinadtsaty (The 13th)
2000 — Sekretny (Secret)
2001 — Tot Bereg & Upadanie (That Shore & Falling Down, soundtracks)
2002 — Kody (Codas) 1987—2002
2002 — Orkestr Tishiny Odinokikh Vetrov (Orchestra of Lonely Winds Silence)
2003 — FM-acoustic
2004 — Chas Tainstva (Mystery Hour)
2005 — Pereferiynoe Zrenie (Peripheral Eyesight)
2006 — Dezhurstvo Uchastkovogo Klochkova (Duty of Police Inspector Klochkov)
2007 — Minory Vesny (Minors of Spring)
2008 — Safe_mp3 2000—2008 (only in mp3 format on the web-site of the band)
2009 — Dolgy I Goryachy (Long and Hot)
2010 — Vse Pechali Mira (All Sorrows of the World)
2011 — Imya Muzy (Name of the Muse)
2012 — Omut Tumanov (Misty Deep Pool, album-book)

Compilation appearances
2004 — Muzyka Palekhskikh Zim (Music of the Winters in Palekh, literary and musical album)
2004 — Ona Vsekh Prekrasney (She's the Most Beautiful, remixes)
2007 — Okhota (Hunting) — 19 (bomba-piter inc.)

Other releases
2007 — Za Pesney Dozhdya (Following the Song of Rain, promo CD)
2007 — Sekretny (Secret — live 2000 Unplugged)

References

External links
 Official site (Russian)
 About Mikhail Larionov (Russian)

Russian rock music groups
Musical groups established in 1987
Russian new wave musical groups
Soviet rock music groups